Agbani is located in Nkanu West Local Government area of Enugu State, Nigeria. It is home to the diverse Eke Market and several institutions of learning such as the Nigerian Law School, Enugu State University of Science and Technology, Renaissance University, Mea Mater School, Airforce School among others. It is the home town of Dr Chimaroke Nnamani, a former executive governor of Enugu State Barr. David Ogbodo Esq.(Chinyelugo) The Executive Oil tycoon and the powerful former Special Assistant to Prof.Jubril Aminu, the former Minister of Petroleum under Gen.Babangida. Chief Onyemuche Nnamani, former SSG of Enugu State and CEO of AutoStar. Barr. Ifeanyi Nwoga, former Attorney-General of Enugu State and Managing Partner, Ifeanyi Nwoga and Associates. Col. Issac Nnonah, Special Adviser to Gen. Babangida and Chairman, Onahsons Group Limited. Chief Sam Ejiofor, former Commissioner. 

Agbani is referred to as a student town because of the presence of students all year round but the presence of other professionals and sectors made it a balanced town. Some of the infrastructural amenities that made it one of the urban areas in the state include presence of commercial Banks, churches, newly constructed building material market, the local government secretariat, good road network. It is a town with about ten villages which are Amaiyi, Orjiagu, Ogbeke, Mbaogodo, Obeagu, Amafor, Ndibinagu, Ajame, Umuoyida, and Ndiagu amafor.

It has its own post office with its postcode as 402004.

References 

Towns in Enugu State